Pterostylis foliata, commonly known as the slender greenhood, is a species of orchid widespread in south-eastern Australia and New Zealand. Flowering plants have a rosette of three to six, dark green, crinkled leaves crowded around the flowering stem and a single dark green and brown flower with a deep V-shaped sinus between the lateral sepals.

Description
Pterostylis foliata is a terrestrial, perennial, deciduous, herb with an underground tuber. Flowering plants have a rosette of between three and six dark green, crinkled leaves crowded around the base of the flowering stem, each leaf 30–80 mm long and 10–16 mm wide. A single flower 17–20 mm long and 7–9 mm wide is borne on a spike 120–300 mm high. The flowers are dark green and brown. The dorsal sepal and petals are fused, forming a hood or "galea" over the column but the dorsal sepal is longer than the petals and has a sharp point on its end. The lateral sepals are erect and in contact with the galea, and there is a deep, V-shaped sinus between the lateral sepals. The labellum is 12–15 mm long, 2–3 mm wide, brown and blunt and protrudes above the sinus. Flowering occurs from August to January.

Taxonomy and naming
Pterostylis foliata was first formally described in 1853 by Joseph Dalton Hooker from a specimen collected in the Ruahine Mountains on the North Island of New Zealand. The description was published in Flora Novae-Zelandiae. The specific epithet (foliata) is a Latin word meaning "leafy".

Distribution and habitat
The slender greenhood usually grows in moist, grassy forest in shady places. It is widespread but uncommon in New South Wales south from near Batlow, in Victoria, south-eastern South Australia, Tasmania and both islands of New Zealand.

References

foliata
Endemic orchids of Australia
Orchids of New South Wales
Orchids of New Zealand
Orchids of South Australia
Orchids of Tasmania
Orchids of Victoria (Australia)
Plants described in 1853